Al-Sadr is a Lebanese-Iraqi-Iranian clerical Shia family originating from Jabal Amel in Lebanon. They are a branch of Musawi family tracing to Musa Ibn Jaafar the seventh Shia Imam.

History
Sadr is a branch of Charafeddine family from Jabal Amel in Lebanon. The Charafeddine family itself is a branch of the Noureddine family, which traces its lineage to Moussa al-Kazim (the seventh Shi'a Imam) and through him to the first Imam, Ali ibn Abi Talib and Fatima Zahra, the daughter of Muhammad (d.632). The as-Sadr family has produced numerous Islamic scholars in Iran, Lebanon, and Iraq, including  Ismail Sadr (d. 1919) and his grandsons Moussa Sadr (disappeared in Libya in 1978) and Mohammad Baqir Sadr (d.1980).

List of notables
Sayyid Muhammad as-Sadr, Prime Minister of Iraq in 1948 
Sadreddine bin Saleh (also Sadr-ed-Deen bin Saleh), 19th century Islamic scholar
Ismail Sadr, (dies 1919), son of Sadr-ed-Deen bin Saleh
Mohammad Mohammad-Sadeq Sadr (1943–1999)
Muqtada al-Sadr, (born 1973), son of Sadr Mohammad Mohammad Sadeq Sadr, heads a large militia in Iraq
Sadreddine Sadr (died 1954) son of Ismail Sadr
Imam Moussa Sadr, (1928–1978?), son of Sadreddine Sadr, Lebanese religious leader
Haidar Sadr, (1891–1937), son of Ismail Sadr
Mohammad Baqir al-Sadr, (1935–1980), son of Haidar Sadr and a major Islamic thinker; also known as the "Third martyr" or "Sadr I"
Amina Sadr bint al-Huda, daughter of Haidar al-Sadr

Ancestors
Ancestor of the Sadr family, Sayyed Saleh Moussawi Ameli, was a descendant of Moussa al-Kazim, the seventh Shi'a Imam, through 27 generations: 
 Sayyid Saleh
 Mohammad
 Ibrahim
 Zein el Abideen
 Ali Noureddine
 Noureddine Ali
 Ezzeddine Hussien
 Mohammad
 Hussien
 Ali
 Muhammad 
 Tajeddine
 Mohammad
 Jalaleddine
 Ahmad
 Hamza
 Saadallah
 Hamza
 Abul Saadat
 Abu Mohammad
 Mohammad
 Abul Hasan Ali
 Abu Tahir
 Mohammad 
 Tahir
 Hussien al Qat'i
 Moussa al Thani
 Ibrahim al Murtaza
 Imam Moussa Al Kadhim
 Imam Jaafar As Sadiq
 Imam Mohammad Al Baqir
 Imam Zein el Abideen
 Imam Al Hussien ibn Ali
 Imam Ali ibn Abi Talib
 Prophet Muhammad 
Source:

Family tree

See also
 Family tree of Ruhollah Khomeini

References

External links
 Family tree of Sadr family  revayatesadr.ir

Arab families
Arabic-language surnames
Hashemite people
Lebanese families
Al-Moussawi family